Etzel may refer to:

People 
 Given name
 Etzel Cardeña (born 1957), Swedish psychologist and researcher
 Etzel, king of the Huns in the Nibelungenlied

 Surname
 Edward Etzel (born 1952), American sport shooter
 Franz Etzel (1902–1970), German politician
 Gunther von Etzel (1862–1948), German general
 Karl Etzel (1812–1865), German railway engineer and architect
 Martin Etzel (1867–1914), German trade union leader
 Otto von Etzel (1860–1934), German soldier and diplomat

Places 
 Etzel (mountain), in the Swiss Alps
 Etzel Pass, in Switzerland
 Etzel, Friedeburg, a village in Friedeburg, Lower Saxony, Germany

Other uses 
 Etzel (Irgun Tzvai-Leumi), a Zionist group that operated in the British Mandate of Palestine from 1931 to 1948
 Etzel (ship), a preserved 1934 motor ship on Lake Zurich in Switzerland